William Bragg may refer to:

 Billy Bragg (born 1957), English musician
 Will Bragg (born 1986), Welsh cricketer
 William Henry Bragg (1862–1942), 1915 Nobel Prize–winning physicist (joint, with his son)
 William Lawrence Bragg (1890–1971), 1915 Nobel Prize–winning physicist (joint, with his father)
 William John Bragg (1858–1941), Ontario farmer and political figure
 William Bragge (1822–1882), English civil engineer and antiquarian
 William Bragg's Mill, Ashdon